Sri Lanka Institute of Information Technology (also known as SLIIT) is a non-profit private university in Sri Lanka specialising in technology and management. It has two campuses and four regional centres, the main campus being based in Malabe and a Metropolitan Campus in Colombo. SLIIT is a member of the Association of Commonwealth Universities and International Association of Universities, and has several partnerships with international universities.

History

Founding
Lalith Athulathmudali who was then the Minister of Trade and Shipping, originally had the Mahapola Trust Fund acquire  in Malabe in the 1980s with the expectation of building a Technological University and the headquarters of the Mahapola Trust Fund. Minister of Commerce Kingsley Wickramaratne and Richard Pathirana would eventually use the land for establishing SLIIT.

The Sri Lanka Institute of Information Technology was established in 1999 by incorporation under the Companies Act of 2007 as a nonprofit company by guarantee (registration number GL 24) with the ability to award Bachelor of Science degrees following amendments to the Universities Act the same year, thus gaining recognition from the Minister of Higher Education. SLIIT was established primarily to educate and train information technology professionals.

Expansions
Initially limited to the fields of information technology and computing, in 2007 SLIIT expanding into new fields of study. These include electronic engineering and business management in collaboration with Sheffield Hallam University. SLIIT also expanded its presence from Colombo and its suburbs to other parts of the country, by establishing centres in Kandy and Matara, making SLIIT accessible in six locations. Presently, SLIIT operates two campuses - the Colombo Metropolitan Campus at Kollupitiya, and the Malabe Campus, with centres in Matara, Kandy, Jaffna, and Kurunegala with an undergraduate student population of over 7,000. A further 1,000 students follow master's degree Programmes, Postgraduate Diploma and other Professional Development Programmes.

In 2011, SLIIT established its faculty of business after it was accredited by the UGC to award Bachelor of Business Administration degrees in Human Capital Management, Accounting and Finance, Marketing Management, Quality management and Management Information Systems.

This was followed in 2012, with the establishment of the Colombo Academy of Hospitality Management (CAHM). The project is a joint venture of SLIIT, Colombo Academy of Hospitality Management (CAHM), and William Angliss Institute of Australia. It has been developed in line with international standards, housing a training kitchen, banqueting facility, training restaurant, model bedrooms, an IT training centre, and team rooms for students' practical training to prepare students for the degree of Bachelor of Tourism and Hospitality Management.

The faculty of engineering was formed in 2013, with it awarding its own Bachelor of Science in Engineering degrees and master's degrees from partner universities such as Curtin University and Sheffield Hallam University. The SLIIT Computing was established as a privately managed subsidiary of SLIIT in Kollupitiya to further expand undergraduate studies. In 2015, SLIIT established its School of Architecture, offering a three-year degree in architecture. In 2016, introducing 16 new research-based degrees including PhD and MPhil degrees approved by the Ministry of Higher Education, Technology and Innovation of Sri Lanka.

Campuses

SLIIT has two main campuses in the Western Province- a Metropolitan campus in central Colombo, and a flagship suburban campus at Malabe. Located between Kaduwela and Malabe along the New Kandy Road, it is the only SLIIT campus with sporting facilities. The smaller Metropolitan campus is located within the Bank of Ceylon Merchant Tower at Kollupitiya, hosting mostly postgraduate facilities.

The institute also has regional centres in Kandy, Matara, Jaffna, and Kurunegala.

Governance
The company (Incorporated under Companies Act) is governed by a board of directors headed by a chairman; the current chairman is Professor L. Rathnayake, who succeeded founding chairman Professor Sam Karunaratne. Due to government ownership of the institute, many of the Board's seats are held by government officials on an ex-officio basis.

The Board delegates power over academic and administrative affairs of the institute to the President, who also acts as CEO of the institute. Professor Lalith Gamage is the current President.

Faculties and Schools

Faculty of Computing
The origins of the Faculty of Computing goes back to the formation of SLIIT in 1999, when it introduced degrees in Information technology. SLIIT offers a 4-year Honours degree in Information technology. Students can choose to specialise on 7 different fields. They are Information Technology, Computer Systems and Network Engineering, Software Engineering, Information Systems Engineering, Cyber Security, Interactive Media and Data Science. Students choose the specialise from the 2nd year onwards and some specialisations are restricted by a particular CGPA threshold.

SLIIT Business School 
SLIIT Business School, which was formally known as the Faculty of Business was established in 2011, offering BBA degree programs.

Faculty of Engineering
Established in 2013, the Faculty of Engineering offers BScs in engineering degree programs.

Faculty of Humanities and Sciences
The Faculty of Science and Education was established in 2017, with the introduction of a degree programs in Biotechnology, natural sciences, law, education, psychology and nursing.

Faculty of Graduate Studies
The Faculty of Graduate Studies is a graduate school that conducts taught and research postgraduate degree programs in the fields of engineering and computing.

William Angliss Institute @ SLIIT 
The William Angliss Institute was started as Colombo Academy of Hospitality Management (CAHM)  2012 as a joint venture with SLIIT and William Angliss Institute of TAFE, offering degrees in tourism and hospitality management.

School of Architecture
The School of Architecture was established in 2015 offering BSc and MSc degree programs in architecture from the Liverpool John Moores University.

SLIIT Academy 
SLIIT Academy (Private) Limited previously known as SLIIT Computing was established a s a subsidiary of Sri Lanka Institute of Information Technology under the companies act No.17 of 1982 in 2011 and was registered with the Registrar of companies under the No. N (PVS) 29707 on 31 December 2001.

SLIIT Academy (Pvt.) Ltd was established to provide educational opportunities to a wider range of students who wish to progress their higher education with an industrial oriented learning experience. SLIIT Academy offers Foundation Programs & Degrees in IT, Business, Engineering & Health and Life Sciences and Post-Graduate Program in MSc in PM which paves the way for students to keep their knowledge up-to-date in this fast-moving environment. With the growing demands of the workforce, SLIIT ACADEMY has been one of the first to introduce one of a kind Educational opportunity to the Nation of Sri Lanka. A blend of theory and practice gives the edge for those who want to enter the workforce with sound academic background and gives a competitive advantage among the others.

Academics

Affiliations
Partnerships with foreign universities allow students to finish their degree at these universities following an initial study period in Sri Lanka.

Research
SLIIT conducts IT and computer-related research and is a partner of ConceptNursery.com, Sri Lanka's technology incubator. The SLIIT Research Symposium is held annually.

Professional courses
SLIIT conducts the Cisco Network Academy courses (CCNA, CCNP and CCSP) under the regional Cisco Network Academy in Sri Lanka. SLIIT is also one of the Microsoft Academies in Sri Lanka offering Certification Courses.

Controversies

Ownership 
The Sri Lanka Institute of Information Technology (SLIIT) was established as a government owned but privately managed institute and was built on a property that belonged to the Mahapola Higher Education Scholarship Trust Fund. In 2015 SLIIT Board of Directors had transferred the assets of SLIIT to a company limited by guarantee, which was set up to manage SLIIT.  The government auditor department said such a transfer was in contravention of the law and resulted in Mahapola not getting the correct amount of funds from SLIIT. In September 2018, Dr. Rajapakshe submitted a Cabinet paper, attempting to establish SLIIT as a fee-levying institution under the Government, but this has so far been unsuccessful.
In 2021, SLIIT has been asked to appear before the Committee On Public Enterprises (Sri Lanka) for the investigations but SLIIT refused to appear before the Committee citing it was not state-owned and COPE expressed its displeasure. In 2020, the Sri Lankan parliament appointed a committee to investigate the misuse of public funds by the SLIIT; this committee included 22 members of the Sri Lankan parliament, and its final report was released in April 2021. According to this report, the top management of the SLIIT has taken a series of informal steps to vest state resources in private ownership. Hence, this committee recommends that legal action be taken under the Public Property Act against parties who alienated state ownership and management of the Sri Lanka Institute of Information Technology without proper authority.

Rankings

Sport
The Malabe campus has a range of sporting facilities including cricket, rugby, basketball, netball, volleyball, tennis, table tennis, badminton, chess and carrom. SLIIT sporting teams compete in a range of local and national competitions.

See also
Information Technology in Sri Lanka

Further reading
 Section 25A of the Universities Act No. 16 of 1978 of Sri Lanka
 21 November 2012 - Extra Ordinary Gazette 1785/22

References

External links 

 

 
1999 establishments in Sri Lanka
Business schools in Sri Lanka
Educational institutions established in 1999
Information technology institutes
Information technology research institutes
Schools of informatics
Universities and colleges in Colombo District
Engineering universities and colleges in Sri Lanka
Universities in Sri Lanka